The  is the diplomatic mission responsible for representing the Government of the United Kingdom in Western Japan.

History 
The 1858 Anglo-Japanese Treaty of Amity and Commerce formally opened trade access between the United Kingdom and Japan and gave British nationals residence rights in Osaka in 1868. Nearby Kobe had already opened to foreigners in 1853. A British Consulate first opened in Osaka in 1911 to supplement the Consulate-General in Kobe. By 1938, Osaka had grown significantly and the status of the mission was upgraded as it was merged to form the British Consulate-General, Osaka-Kobe. In 1973, the British Consulate-General, Osaka replaced Osaka-Kobe. Between 2006 and 2007, the consulates in Fukuoka and Nagoya were closed with all representation to Western Japan consolidated at the British Consulate-General in Osaka.

Role 
The primary role of the British Consulate-General in Osaka is to foster collaboration and trade between the UK and Japan. Representatives of the Department for International Trade Osaka and UK Science & Innovation Network in Japan are based at the consulate. Staff at the Consulate-General run events, build networks in Japanese industry, support UK companies to enter the Japanese market and contribute to crisis preparations for British nationals in Japan.

Consular services for British nationals and visa applicants are provided by the British Embassy in Tokyo.

Location 
The offices of the British Consulate-General in Osaka are on the 19th floor of the Midosuji Grand Tower, located in the Bakuromachi 3-Chome area of Osaka's Chūō ward.

Consul-General 
A Consul-General has represented the UK Government in Osaka since 1938. Before 1938, the Consul-General for Kansai was based at the British Consulate-General, Kobe, and until 1938 the Osaka mission was only a consulate. Between 1938 and 1973, the Consul-General managed both the Osaka and Kobe missions.

Gallery

See also 

 Japan–United Kingdom relations
 Foreign relations of the United Kingdom

References 

Osaka
United Kingdom
Organizations based in Osaka
Japan–United Kingdom relations